The Konrad Adenauer Prize was an award by the Germany Foundation, a national conservative organisation associated with the Christian Democratic Union, from 1967 to 2001 It was given annually between 1973 and 1975, then every two years, with exceptions, from 1975 to 2001. It was given to right-wing intellectuals and was named in memory of statesman and former German Chancellor Konrad Adenauer. The journalism and literary prizes are now both separate prizes altogether. 

This is not to be confused with the Konrad-Adenauer-Preis given by the city of Cologne.

List of prize winners

References

German awards
Konrad Adenauer
German literary awards
German science and technology awards
German journalism awards

de:Preisträger des Konrad-Adenauer-Preises der Deutschland-Stiftung